Veselin Minev (Bulgarian Cyrillic: Веселин Минев; born 14 October 1980) is a retired Bulgarian footballer who played as a left-back and current assistant manager of Arda Kardzhali.

He has a twin brother, Yordan, who is also a footballer.

Club career
Minev, together with his twin brother, started his career at Hebar Pazardzhik. Later, Minev joined Botev Plovdiv.

Levski Sofia
Minev came to Levski in June 2006.

On 9 May 2009, Minev and his twin brother Yordan entered in the history of The Eternal Derby. The situation was even more interesting, because Veselin was a left full-back and his brother Yordan was a right midfielder, and Veselin guarded his brother Yordan. Despite the tackles, after a foul against Veselin, Yordan came to him and call the referee.

He became a Champion of Bulgaria in 2008/2009 season. In 2009/2010 season, Levski achieved qualifying for UEFA Europa League becoming 3rd in the final ranking. During the 2010/2011 Levski qualified for UEFA Europa League after eliminating Dundalk F.C., Kalmar FF and AIK Fotboll. Levski was drawn in Group C, facing Gent, Lille and Sporting CP.

Antalyaspor

On 30 May 2011, Minev signed a three-year deal with Turkish club Antalyaspor for an undisclosed fee. He left the club in early December 2012 for personal reasons.

Botev Plovdiv
On 12 December 2012, immediately following the appointment of Stanimir Stoilov as head coach, Minev signed a 1.5-year contract (with the option for an additional year) with his former club Botev Plovdiv. Minev was among the first choice defenders during his time with the "canaries", captaining the team on occasions. His last game for the club was the 4:0 home victory against Libertas in the first qualifying round for UEFA Europa League on 3 July 2014.

Levski Sofia
In July 2014 Minev's contract with Botev was terminated due to the financial problems that occurred in the club. On the 7 July 2014 he returned to Levski signing a new 1+1 year deal with the club. He was released in June 2017.

Etar
On 16 June 2017, Minev signed a 1-year contract with newly promoted Etar Veliko Tarnovo.

Vereya
On 13 January 2018 Minev joined Vereya Stara Zagora on a six-month contract.

Tsarsko Selo
On 11 June 2018, Minev signed a 1-year contract with Second League club Tsarsko Selo.

International career
On 28 August 2009, Minev received his first international call-up for the World Qualifier match against Montenegro. He remained an unused substitute for the game.
On 10 October 2009, he made his debut for the national side in the 1:4 away loss to Cyprus, playing the full 90 minutes of the game. Minev was a starter for Bulgaria during the first two 2014 World Cup qualifiers, but in October 2012 he received a two-match ban for his involvement in a number of incidents during the ill-tempered match against Armenia.

Later and coaching career
In January 2021, Minew returned to Hebar Pazardzhik as a youth coach. He left the position in April 2021 to join his former teammate, Zhivko Milanov, as assistant manager at Levski Sofia. After Milanov was released in September 2021, Minew also left his position. A week later, Minev came out of retirement to play for Vihren Sandanski. He played for the club for the rest of the season.

At the end of May 2022, Minew was appointed assistant manager of FC Arda Kardzhali.

Career statistics

Club
As of 13 January 2018.

International

Honours
Levski Sofia
 Champion of Bulgaria:  2006–07, 2008–09
 Bulgarian Cup 2007
 Bulgarian Supercup 2006–07, 2008–09

References

External links
 
 
 Veselin Minev at LevskiSofia.info
 
 
 

1980 births
Living people
Bulgarian footballers
Bulgaria international footballers
Association football defenders
FC Hebar Pazardzhik players
PFC Belasitsa Petrich players
Botev Plovdiv players
PFC Levski Sofia players
Antalyaspor footballers
SFC Etar Veliko Tarnovo players
FC Vereya players
FC Tsarsko Selo Sofia players
FC Vitosha Bistritsa players
First Professional Football League (Bulgaria) players
Second Professional Football League (Bulgaria) players
Süper Lig players
Bulgarian expatriate footballers
Bulgarian expatriate sportspeople in Turkey
Expatriate footballers in Turkey
Bulgarian twins
Twin sportspeople
Sportspeople from Pazardzhik